Hemmatabad (also Romanized as Hemmatābād; also known as Qal‘eh Masharaf) is a village in Tabadkan Rural District, in the Central District of Mashhad County, Razavi Khorasan Province, Iran. At the 2006 census, its population was 34, in 10 families.

References 

Populated places in Mashhad County